Kryst is a surname. Notable people with the surname include:

Asa Kryst (born 1993), American soccer player
Cheslie Kryst (1991–2022), American model and television correspondent

See also
Krist, given name and surname